The 1998 Family Circle Cup was a women's tennis tournament played on outdoor clay courts at the Sea Pines Plantation on Hilton Head Island, South Carolina in the United States that was part of Tier I of the 1998 WTA Tour. It was the 28th edition of the tournament and was held from March 30 through April 5, 1998.

Finals

Singles

 Amanda Coetzer defeated  Irina Spîrlea 6–3, 6–4
 It was Coetzer's only title of the year and the 13th of her career.

Doubles

 Conchita Martínez /  Patricia Tarabini defeated  Lisa Raymond /  Rennae Stubbs 3–6, 6–4, 6–4
 It was Martínez's 1st title of the year and the 34th of her career. It was Tarabini's only title of the year and the 12th of her career.

References

External links
 WTA Tournament Profile

Family Circle Cup
Charleston Open
Family Circle Cup
Family Circle Cup
Family Circle Cup
Family Circle Cup